Lady Elizabeth Butler, Countess of Derby (1660–1717), was an English court official. She served as Mistress of the Robes to queen Mary II of England between 1689 and 1694.

She was the daughter of Thomas Butler, 6th Earl of Ossory and Emilia Butler, Countess of Ossory. She married William Richard George Stanley, 9th Earl of Derby, in 1673. When the household of queen Mary II was officially formed, Elizabeth Butler was appointed on 22 April 1689 to the position of principal lady-in-waiting with the title Groom of the Stole and Mistress of the Robes. She was given a salary of £1200 per annum (£800 as groom of the stole, £400 as mistress of the Robes).

Notes and references

 G. E. Cokayne, The Complete Peerage (1910–1959) (Ormonde).
 A. Strickland, Lives of the Queens of England, London (1888) 
 http://courtofficers.ctsdh.luc.edu/MaryII.list.pdf

1660 births
1717 deaths
Mistresses of the Robes
Court of James II of England
Daughters of Irish earls
Derby